Hagerman High School is a small high school located in Hagerman, New Mexico, southwest of Roswell.

Sports
Hagerman High School has a gymnasium with a seating capacity of 600, over four times its enrollment, for its teams, the Bobcats. Bobcats have nine football state championships, the last being in 2013 with a 12–0 record.

Partnership with Eastern New Mexico University
The high school has a "partnership" with Eastern New Mexico University (ENMU).  Hagerman High students attend workshops at ENMU, and have access to special scholarships from ENMU.

Art
The Senior Class of 1919 commissioned a landscape by noted artist Herbert A. Collins of Stanley Lake in the Sawtooth Range, which was presented to the school.

See also
 Eastern New Mexico University
 List of high schools in New Mexico

References

External links
Hagerman High School official web site
 http://www.nmact.org/school?school_id=10338
 http://www.dexterdemons.org/

Public high schools in New Mexico
Schools in Chaves County, New Mexico